411 may refer to:

 The year AD 411, the four hundred and eleventh year of the Gregorian calendar
 411 BC
 4-1-1, a telephone directory assistance number in the United States and Canada
 By extension, a slang term for "information"
 What's the 411?, debut album by Mary J. Blige released in 1992
 The 411, British R&B group
 4:1:1 chroma subsampling
 Volkswagen 411, a car from the late 1960s
 Bristol 411, a high-performance hand-built luxury car from the 1970s
 411 (anthology), a three issue anthology, published by Marvel Comics, consisting of short-stories concerning terrorism
 411 is used as a nickname for Kambo, Norway
 .411 is also the extension for files storing thumbnail-sized versions of pictures taken by early models of SONY's Mavica cameras.
 411 Video Magazine, a skateboarding video series
November 2016 Jakarta protests, also known as the 411 Action

See also

 
 41 (disambiguation)